NJ Transit operates or contracts out the following bus routes, all of which originate from Newark, Jersey City, Hoboken, or Elizabeth. Many were once streetcar lines. These routes are operated from garages in NJ Transit's Northern and Central Divisions, or by Community Transportation under contract. Not included in the list of lines below is the Newark Light Rail system, which is operated from the Central Division.

Routes

Northern Division
The following lines are operated from garages in NJ Transit's Northern Division. Some lines are scheduled by NJ Transit, but are operated by ONE/Independent Bus Co under contract and based out of Coach USA's Elizabeth garage. All routes including ones operated by ONE are exact fare lines. In this table, PSCT represents Public Service Coordinated Transport, a predecessor to Transport of New Jersey.

Destinations shown are for the full route except for branching.

Central Division

The following lines are operated from garages in NJ Transit's Central Division. All lines are exact fare lines except for the 63, 64, 67, and 68. In this table, PSCT represents Public Service Coordinated Transport, a predecessor to Transport of New Jersey.

Destinations shown are for the full route except for branching.

Central Division, Essex County

Central Division: Union County

Central Division: South and west from Hudson County/Newark

Central Division: North and west from Newark
All of these routes originate from Newark Penn Station.

NOTES
 The #71 and #73 do not carry local passengers between Orange and Newark Penn.
 The #79 only carries customers from Newark and the Oranges to/from Parsippany-Troy Hills.
 The #21 provides frequent service between Orange and Newark.

Central Division: Essex County crosstown routes

Former routes
This list includes routes that have been renumbered or are now operated by private companies.

References

External links
Unofficial NJ Transit bus map
New Jersey Transit - Bus

 001
 001